The Flxible New Look bus was a very popular transit bus introduced in 1959 by The Flxible Company, and produced from 1960 until 1978, when the New Look was replaced by the "870" Advanced Design Bus. Over its 17-year production run 13,121 Flxible New Look buses were manufactured.

Design
The Flxible New Look bus shares many design features with the GM New Look bus that was introduced in 1959, however the Flxible New look bus was somewhat more rugged and solid. Both buses featured large 6-piece "fishbowl" windshields, forward-slanting side windows, fluted aluminum siding, and slide/glide front passenger doors. Both buses were also equipped with the same engine: the Detroit Diesel 6V-71 (6-cylinder) / 8V-71 (8-cylinder) diesel engine (however, 150 propane-fueled Flxible New Looks were built for the Chicago Transit Authority in the mid-1960s, Detroit Diesel 4-71 (4-cylinder) diesel engines were available for some models in the mid-1960s, and Cummins 165-285 and 903 8-cylinder diesel engines were available until 1973 as an alternative to the Detroit Diesel engines).

Until 1963, these buses carried both the Flxible and the Twin nameplates, with the Twin name located in a small oval beneath the Flxible shield on the front of the buses (Twin Coach had been a manufacturer of transit buses as early as 1927 and sold its transit bus product line to Flxible in 1953). In 1964 and 1965 Flxible produced a suburban model meant for longer distance highway routes, and these buses were equipped with all forward-facing high-backed seats and overhead luggage racks, but lacked a rear exit door and standee windows. Air conditioning was an available option on all models, and in most cases was identifiable by a bulge above the rear window where the roof-mounted condenser and cooling fan were located (some buses were built with under-floor air conditioning). Air-ride suspension was standard on all models.

Manufacture
At the start of production all New Looks were built at the Flxible factory in Loudonville, Ohio, and a majority of the New Looks continued to be built here during the life of the New Look's production run.

In 1963, Flxible started building a line of shorter buses at the former Southern Coach factory in Evergreen, Alabama. The buses built in Evergreen were generally identical in appearance to those built in Loudonville, except that the Evergreen buses had only two headlights, while the Loudonville buses had four. The Evergreen buses were available with either the 4-71 (4-cylinder) or 6V-71 (6-cylinder) Detroit Diesel engine. Production in Evergreen stopped in 1966.

In 1965, Flxible licensed their New Look design to Canadair Ltd., an aircraft manufacturer in Ville St-Laurent, Quebec. The intent of this licensing venture was to enter the Canadian bus market, however production stopped in 1966 after just one order for Montreal (50 buses for Montreal Transportation Commission).
 
In 1970, Flxible was purchased by Rohr Industries, and in 1974 a new factory and corporate headquarters were opened in Delaware, Ohio. Final assembly of all New Looks was moved to Delaware, with the Loudonville factory still being used for the manufacture of sub-assemblies and parts. It was only available with the 6V-71 (6-cylinder) Detroit Diesel engine.

Competition with General Motors
During the 1960s, Flxible was the only large-production competitor to General Motors in the American transit bus market, although it was still a distant second with GM building more than twice as many buses. The Flxible New Look bus bears a close resemblance to the GM New Look bus, and in fact Flxible New Looks were commonly equipped with GM engines. This was due largely to the consent decree resulting from the 1956 anti-trust case United States v. General Motors Corp. which mandated that GM's bus components, engines, and transmissions be made available for sale to other manufacturers, free of royalties. However, it should also be noted that prior to the consent decree a small number of earlier model (pre-New Look) Flxible buses were built with GM engines, at the same time that GM vice president Charles F. Kettering was also chairman of the board at Flxible. It has been suggested that prior to the consent decree GM may have made its diesel engines available to Flxible in order to reduce the criticisms of GM's business practices that some felt were monopolistic.

In 1966 GM began offering its Detroit Diesel 8V-71 8-cylinder diesel engine on its  New Look transit buses; however GM would not equip its  models with anything larger than the 6V-71 6-cylinder diesel engine. In response to the desire by some transit agencies for a shorter bus with a larger engine (mainly for hilly routes, freeway driving, or to provide extra power for air conditioning equipped buses), Flxible offered its  New Look with the Detroit Diesel 8V-71, the Cummins 165-285, and the Cummins 903 8-cylinder diesel engines.

Model designations
Several different variations of model designations were used for Flxible New Look buses, with changes being made over time and between the various manufacturing locations. The letters and numbers gave a basic description of the type of bus as follows:

Two typical bus model designations of first-generation Flxible New Looks are F2D6V-401-1 and FD6V-401-7-UL-AC.
Two typical bus model designations of second-generation Flxible New Looks are 111CC-C3-1 and 111DD-D5-1.
Two typical bus model designations of third-generation Flxible New Looks are 45096-6-0 and 53102-8-1.

See also

GM New Look bus – competing bus built by General Motors
Flxible Metro – originally the Grumman 870, the succeeding model
Flyer Industries D700A – bus shell design similar to the Flxible New Looks and marketed mostly in Canada
 List of buses

References

Stauss, Ed (1988). The Bus World Encyclopedia of Buses, Woodland Hills, CA: Stauss Publications. 
 Ebert, Robert R. (2001). Flxible: A History of the Bus and the Company, Yellow Springs, OH: Antique Power, Inc. .
Luke, William A. & Metler, Linda L. (2005). City Transit Buses of the 20th Century, Hudson, WI: Iconografix. 
McKane, John (2001). Flxible Transit Buses - 1953-1995 Photo Archive, Hudson, WI: Iconografix. 
McKane, John H. & Squier, Gerald L. (2006). Welcome Aboard the GM New Look Bus, Hudson, WI: Iconografix. 
Ohio Museum of Transportation, omot.org, retrieved on 2007-02-04
Ohio Museum of Transportation - Flxible Transit Coach Production Lists, omot.org, archived on 2005-08-28 on archive.org, retrieved on 2007-02-04
History: The Flxible Corporation, flxibleowners.org, retrieved on 2007-02-04
Twin Coach Company, Records, 1914-56, library.kent.edu, retrieved on 2007-02-04
Coach Information Network, coachinfo.com, retrieved on 2007-02-04

External links

Buses of the United States
Vehicles introduced in 1960
Full-size buses